Motorcycling Australia is the governing body for motorcycle racing in Australia, covering road racing, motocross, trials, supercross, dirt track, supermoto and speedway. Motorcycling Australia is affiliated with the international governing body, Fédération Internationale de Motocyclisme (FIM), based in Geneva, Switzerland.

The body oversees state governing bodies Motorcycling New South Wales, Motorcycling Victoria, Motorcycling Queensland, Motorcycling South Australia, Motorcycling Western Australia, Motorcycling Tasmania and Motorcycling Northern Territory.

Originally formed in 1928 as the Auto Cycle Council of Australia (ACCA), the name changed to Motorcycling Australia in 1992. Today, the organisation has in excess of 21,000 competitors, more than 350 affiliated clubs, and over 3000 registered officials.

History
Originally formed in 1928 as the Auto Cycle Council of Australia (ACCA), the name changed to Motorcycling Australia in 1992. The organisation joined the FIM in 1975.

Today it has over 32,700 members, with over 350 affiliated clubs and 3000 officials.

Series
Motorcycling Australia sanctions the following series:

Australian Superbike Championship

The Australian Superbike Championship (ASBK) is a national motorcycle racing championship in Australia, organized by Motorcycling Australia.

Australian Supercross Championship

The Australian Supercross Championship was inaugurated in 2015, following on from various series of this discipline of stadium motocross dating back to the late 1970s. The series is usually held over 4-5 rounds across various major stadiums, and takes place in spring and early summer, from October to December. The series incorporates the AUS-X OPEN which also doubles as the first leg of the Oceania Supercross Championship (the second being the SX Open in Auckland), and the Australian Grand Prix of the FIM Supercross World Championship. American Justin Brayton has dominated the series in recent years, winning multiple titles.

ProMX

The ProMX Motocross Championship (known for sponsorship reasons as the Penrite ProMX Motocross Championship), is the premier Australian Motocross series, sanctioned by Motorcycling Australia. The series runs throughout autumn and winter, before the Supercross stadium series in spring, and features three classes; the premier class MX1, MX2, and MX3, which also features junior riders. An MXW class for women is also part of the series.

Australian Off Road Championship

Australian Off Road Championship (AORC) is an off-road-based rally championship held annually in Australia, with the inaugural event held in 1981. AORC events are defined as ‘long course’ events that are conducted on a track of no less than 15 kilometres in length, but are usually between 75 and 100 kilometres. The courses and tracks used for the AORC vary greatly and can be narrow, twisting and tree-lined, undulating farmland tracks, sand dunes and creek crossings, often incorporating man-made jumps and other obstacles but usually have high average speeds.

Australian Speedway Championship

The Australian Speedway Championship is the premier speedway racing event in Australia.

See also

Motorsport in Australia
List of Australian motor racing series

References

External links
Motorcycling Australia

Motorsport governing bodies in Australia
Motorcyclists organizations
Motorcycle sport
1928 establishments in Australia
Sports organizations established in 1928
National members of the FIM
Motorcycle racing in Australia
Freestyle motocross